Tara Tiba is an Iranian born singer based in Australia. Her music genre is Persian traditional music  singing with jazz, Latin and contemporary music. She has been nominated for 2019's ARIA Award for Best World Music Album.

Tiba recorded an EP in 2010 but was not able to get it released due to Iranian laws. She then moved to Perth in 2012 and released an album in 2014. She released a second album, Omid, in 2019.

Discography

Albums

Awards and nominations

ARIA Music Awards
The ARIA Music Awards is an annual awards ceremony that recognises excellence, innovation, and achievement across all genres of Australian music. They commenced in 1987.

! 
|-
| 2019
| Omid
| ARIA Award for Best World Music Album
| 
| 
|-

References

External links
Tara Tiba

Living people
Australian women singers
21st-century Iranian women singers
Year of birth missing (living people)
Iranian emigrants to Australia